Spišské Tomášovce is a village and municipality in the Spišská Nová Ves District in the Košice Region of central-eastern Slovakia.

History
In historical records the village was first mentioned in 1229.

Geography
The village lies at an altitude of 532 metres and covers an area of 13.621 km².
In 2011 had a population of 1702 inhabitants.

References

External links
http://en.e-obce.sk/obec/spissketomasovce/spisske-tomasovce.html
http://www.spissketomasovce.ocu.sk

Villages and municipalities in Spišská Nová Ves District